Careless is the debut album by singer/songwriter Stephen Bishop. It includes two hit singles: "On and On", which peaked at No. 11 on the Billboard singles chart, and "Save It for a Rainy Day" which made No. 22. The album itself rose to No. 34 on the Billboard albums chart. Notable contributors to the album include Eric Clapton, Art Garfunkel and Chaka Khan.

Track listing
All songs written by Stephen Bishop.

Personnel

Musicians

 Stephen Bishop – lead vocals (1-8, 10-12), backing vocals (1, 3, 6, 11), acoustic guitar, trombone (3)
 John Barlow Jarvis – electric piano (1, 10), acoustic piano (2-4, 6, 8, 10)
 Alan Lindgren – synthesizers (4, 8)
 Steve Paietta – accordion (7)
 Larry Knechtel – electric piano (11), organ (11)
 Andrew Gold – electric guitar (1, 6)
 Michael Staton – steel guitar (1), backing vocals (1)
 Lee Ritenour – acoustic guitar (2)
 Eric Clapton – slide guitar (4), electric guitar solo (10)
 Jay Graydon – electric guitar (4), acoustic guitar (6)
 Larry Carlton – acoustic guitar (7)
 Tommy Tedesco – mandolin (7)
 Jeff Staton Jones – electric guitar (10), bass (10), backing vocals (10)
 Mac Cridlin – bass (1, 3, 4)
 Reinie Press – bass (2, 8, 11)
 Max Bennett – bass (6, 7)
 Larry Brown – drums (1, 3, 4)
 Jim Gordon – drums (2, 8, 11)
 John Guerin – drums (6, 7)
 Russ Kunkel – drums (10)
 Victor Feldman – marimba (1), percussion (1, 7), vibraphone (1, 7)
 Ray Pizzi – saxophone solo (4)
 Ian Freebairn-Smith – string arrangements (2, 7), string conductor (2), horn arrangements (4, 10), woodwind arrangements (7)
 Lee Holdridge – string arrangements and conductor (3, 5, 8)
 Chaka Khan – backing vocals (2, 10), co-lead vocals (7)
 Art Garfunkel – backing vocals (3, 6, 11)
 Leah Kunkel – backing vocals (11)

Production
 Producers – Stephen Bishop and Henry Lewy
 Engineer – Henry Lewy
 Assistant Engineers – Leslie Jones and Helen Silvani
 Recorded at ABC Recording Studios and A&M Studios (Los Angeles, CA).
 Mastered by Bernie Grundman
 Cover and Back Photography – Gary Heery
 Inside Photography – Gary Heery, Patti Boyd Harrison and Charles Villiers.

References

1976 debut albums
ABC Records albums
Stephen Bishop (singer) albums
Albums arranged by Lee Holdridge